Rene Mlekuž (born 25 August 1975 in Slovenska Bistrica) is a Slovenian former alpine skier who competed in the 2002 Winter Olympics.

World Cup results

Season standings

Race podiums

References

External links
 sports-reference.com
 http://data.fis-ski.com/dynamic/athlete-biography.html?sector=AL&listid=&competitorid=40812

1975 births
Living people
Slovenian male alpine skiers
Olympic alpine skiers of Slovenia
Alpine skiers at the 2002 Winter Olympics
People from Slovenska Bistrica